William Haye (15 September 1948 – 18 March 2019) was a Jamaican cricketer who played in seven first-class and two List A matches for Jamaica between 1970 and 1977. In March 2019, he was shot dead in his own home, before the house was set on fire.

See also
 List of cricketers who were murdered

References

External links
 

1948 births
2019 deaths
Jamaican cricketers
Jamaican murder victims
Deaths by firearm in Jamaica
Male murder victims
People murdered in Jamaica
Place of birth missing